Mohamed El Mourabit is a Moroccan professional footballer who plays as a forward.

References

1998 births
Living people
Moroccan footballers
Association football forwards
Raja CA players
Olympic Club de Safi players
SCC Mohammédia players